Cube toast is a dessert dish that consists of brioche cooked as French toast formed in an upright position that is filled with foods such as vanilla ice cream, granola, mochi, Pocky candy, cubed pieces of French toast, fruits such as blueberries and strawberries, strawberry sauce, chocolate sauce and other ingredients.

It was invented in 2016 at a restaurant named "Double Chin" in Chinatown, Boston, a neighborhood in Boston, Massachusetts.

See also

 List of American desserts

References

External links
 If You Don't Know What Cube Toast Is, You're Missing Out. Delish.

American desserts
Food and drink introduced in 2016
Toast dishes